Canute Mikkelsen (or Canute Cobson) was a Roman Catholic prelate who served as Bishop of Viborg (1451–1478).

Biography
On 14 Apr 1451, Canute Mikkelsen was appointed during the papacy of Pope Nicholas V as Bishop of Viborg. On 5 Mar 1452, he was consecrated bishop by Radulphus, Bishop of Città di Castello, with Giovanni Castiglione, Bishop of Penne e Atri, and Marco Marinoni, Bishop of Alessandria, serving as co-consecrators. He served as Bishop of Viborg until his resignation in 1478.

References 

15th-century Roman Catholic bishops in Denmark
Bishops appointed by Pope Nicholas V